Puce Moment is a short 6-minute film by Kenneth Anger. Filmed in 1949, Puce Moment resulted from the unfinished short film Puce Women. The film opens with a camera watching 1920s-style flapper gowns being taken off a dress rack. The dresses are removed and danced off the rack to music. A long-lashed woman, Yvonne Marquis, dresses in the dark green gown and walks to her vanity to apply perfume. She lies on a chaise longue which then begins to move around the room and eventually out to a patio. Borzois appear and she prepares to take them for a walk.

Production

The original soundtrack was Verdi opera music; in 1970, Anger re-released the film with a new psychedelic folk-rock soundtrack performed by Jonathan Halper.

The gowns used were owned by Anger's grandmother, who had been a costume designer in the silent film era. The interior shots were filmed in the house of Samson De Brier, who later appeared in Anger's Inauguration of the Pleasure Dome (1954). The exterior shots of the patio were filmed at the house of Max Rapp, who was an orchestra contractor at Universal Pictures. The house had been built by Wallace Beery in 1924 and was one of the first Hollywood Mansions in the Hollywood Dell.

Anger attempts to recreate silent era style by using alternating camera speeds. Curtis Harrington was a cinematographer on the film.

Yvonne Marquis, who was Anger's cousin, moved to Mexico shortly after the film was made. Anger claims Marquis was a mistress to Lázaro Cárdenas, the Former President of Mexico.

References

External links

1949 films
Films directed by Kenneth Anger
1940s American films